Guiza Djédjé (born 2 November 1995) is an Ivorian footballer who plays as a forward for MAS Fez in Morocco.

International career

International goals
Scores and results list Ivory Coast's goal tally first.

Honours 
Séwé Sport
Winner
 Ligue 1 (2): 2012–13, 2013–14

Runner-up
 CAF Confederation Cup: 2014

MAS Fez
Winner
 Coupe du Trône: 2016

References

External links 
 
Footballdatabase

1995 births
Living people
Ivorian footballers
Ivory Coast international footballers
Séwé Sport de San-Pédro players
Maghreb de Fès players
Botola players
Ivorian expatriate footballers
Expatriate footballers in Morocco
Ivorian expatriate sportspeople in Morocco
Association football forwards
People from Gagnoa
2016 African Nations Championship players
Ivory Coast A' international footballers